The AryaMañjuśrīmūlakalpa or Arya-Mañjuśrī-mūla-kalpa is a text of the Kriyā-tantra class. It is affiliated with the bodhisattva Mañjuśrī. It contains violent, sensual and sexual tantric rituals.

The Mañjuśrīmūlakalpa is often cited as the earliest example of an extant Indian Buddhist Tantra.  Some scholars identify it as a compilation of a core dated circa 6th century with accretions and additions. The Sanskrit version, significantly longer than its corresponding Chinese and Tibetan renderings, is still extant.

The Mañjuśrīmūlakalpa, which later was classified under Kriyatantra, states that mantras taught in the Shaiva, Garuda and Vaishnava tantras will be effective if applied by Buddhists since they were all taught originally by Manjushri. The attribution to Mañjuśrī is an attempt by its author(s) to counter the objection that the teachings in this text are of non-Buddhist origin.

Date 
According to Sanderson (2009: 129) and the study by Matsunaga (1985), the text is datable to about 775 CE.

Editions 
The editio princeps of the Sanskrit text was by T. Ganapati Sastri in three volumes (Trivandrum, 1920, 1923, 1925). Rahul Sankrityayana's edition appeared in 1934.  Ganapati Sastri's edition with some modifications was reprinted by P. L. Vaidya in 1964.

Notes

Buddhist tantras
Mañjuśrī
Tibetan Buddhist practices
Vajrayana